is a Japanese voice actress and singer from Tokyo, Japan. She is affiliated with the talent agency HoriPro International. As a singer, she is signed under Lantis. Originally a child actress, she appeared in many commercials, dramas, NHK Educational TV programs, and stage productions. After participating in an audition sponsored by Horipro, She played her first main role as Fleur Blanc in the anime Eureka Seven AO in 2012.

She is known for her roles as Ran Shibuki in Aikatsu!, Sāya Yamabuki in BanG Dream!, and Uzuki Shimamura in The Idolmaster Cinderella Girls; as Sāya, she is a member of the band Poppin'Party as its drummer. She also performed theme songs for anime such as Masamune-kun's Revenge, and Knight's & Magic.

Biography
Ōhashi was born in Urawa, Saitama on September 13, 1994, and moved to Tokyo when she was five. There, she joined a theater company and appearing in various television commercials, dramas, NHK Educational TV programs, and stage productions. She was inspired to become a voice actress after receiving voice acting lessons she had with her theater company.
 
In 2011, she participated in the 36th Horipro Talent Scout Campaign where she remained a finalist and joined the talent agency Horipro. She made her voice acting debut in 2012, playing a minor character in Amagami SS+ plus. In April of the same year, she was cast as Fleur Blanc in Eureka Seven AO thus becoming her first main role. Later that year, she was cast as Uzuki Shimamura in the mobile game The Idolmaster Cinderella Girls becoming her second main role. She would later reprise the role in various other media, including the anime adaptation. She has since appeared in many stage events and radio programs.
 
In 2014, she made her official debut as a singer for Lantis by performing Sabagebu! -Survival Game Club!- opening theme song "YES!!" which she also played the main character, Momoka Sonokawa. That same year, she voiced the character Kurome in Akame ga Kill!. Her first album  was released on May 18, 2016; the album peaked at fourteenth on the Oricon weekly charts.
 
In 2015, she was cast as a drummer character, Sāya Yamabuki of the band Poppin'Party, in Bushiroad's multimedia franchise BanG Dream!. She has stated that although she had drumming skill prior to joining the franchise, she had never performed them in public.
 
In 2017, she played the character Aki Adagaki in Masamune-kun's Revenge which she also performed the opening theme song. Later that year, she was cast as Adeltroot Alter in Knight's & Magic; she also performed the series' ending theme song. The following year, she was cast as Vodka in Cygames's multimedia franchise Uma Musume Pretty Derby.

In February 2020, Anime Frontier announced that Ōhashi would perform her first U.S. concert on May 8 in Fort Worth, Texas, but the event was cancelled due to the COVID-19 pandemic.

Filmography

Anime

Films

Video games

Dubbing

Live-action
Beautiful Love, Wonderful Life, Kim Cheong-ah (Seol In-ah)
Chip 'n Dale: Rescue Rangers, Det. Ellie Steckler (KiKi Layne)

Animation
Mune: Guardian of the Moon, Mune
The Nut Job 2: Nutty by Nature, Heather Muldoon

Live-action
 Anime Supremacy! (2022), Yūki (voice)

Others
There's No Way I Can Have A Lover! (*Or Maybe There Is?!), Renako Amaori (promotional video)

Discography

Studio albums

Singles

References

External links
  
  
 Official agency profile 
 Ayaka Ōhashi at Lantis 
 

1994 births
Living people
Anime singers
Horipro artists
Japanese child actresses
Japanese video game actresses
Japanese voice actresses
Lantis (company) artists
Singers from Tokyo
Voice actresses from Tokyo
21st-century Japanese actresses
21st-century Japanese singers
21st-century Japanese women singers